Jaswantgarh is a small town in Nagaur district, Rajasthan, India, situated about 210 km from Jaipur and around 35 km from Salasar. It is in between Ladnun and Sujangarh on National Highway 65.

References

Villages in Nagaur district